Majk (or Majkpuszta) is a small village in the municipality of Oroszlány near Tatabánya in the Central Transdanubian region, Komárom-Esztergom County, Hungary. Majk is famous for the baroque Camaldolese monastery, designed by Jakob Fellner

Populated places in Komárom-Esztergom County